Vitaliy Albertovich Khan (born 4 September 1985 in Almaty) is a male freestyle swimmer from Kazakhstan, who competed for his native country at the 2004 Summer Olympics in Athens, Greece. There he ended up in 55th place in the men's 200 m freestyle event.

References

External links
 

1985 births
Living people
Kazakhstani male freestyle swimmers
Olympic swimmers of Kazakhstan
Swimmers at the 2004 Summer Olympics
Asian Games competitors for Kazakhstan
Swimmers at the 2006 Asian Games
Islamic Solidarity Games competitors for Kazakhstan
Islamic Solidarity Games medalists in swimming
Sportspeople from Almaty
20th-century Kazakhstani people
21st-century Kazakhstani people